Austin and Paley was the title of a practice of architects in Lancaster, Lancashire, England, in the late 19th and early 20th centuries.  The practice had been founded in 1836 by Edmund Sharpe.  The architects during the period covered by this list are Hubert Austin and Henry Paley.  Henry Paley had joined the practice as a partner in 1886 when his father, E. G. Paley, was Austin's partner; the practice then became known as Paley, Austin and Paley.  E. G. Paley died in 1895, and the practice continued under the title of Austin and Paley.  Austin's son joined the practice as a partner in 1914.

This list covers the non-ecclesiastical works executed by the practice during the partnership of Hubert Austin and Henry Paley between 1895 and 1914.  These works include additions made to houses, schools and hospitals, a new educational establishment, an orphanage, an office and shop, a hotel, and three crosses of varying types.  Because of the location of the practice, their non-ecclesiastical work was in the areas that are now Cumbria, Lancashire, and Greater Manchester, with one example in North Yorkshire.

Key

See also
 Lists of works by Sharpe, Paley and Austin

References

Bibliography

Gothic Revival architecture
Austin and Paley